The NWA National Championship is a professional wrestling championship owned and promoted by the U.S.-based, National Wrestling Alliance (NWA).

The championship was established in January 1980 as the top singles title of Georgia Championship Wrestling (GCW), a prominent NWA-affiliated promotion. Until its September 1986 deactivation, the title remained Georgia-based—across 3 different owners (GCW; Championship Wrestling from Georgia, and Jim Crockett Promotions).

The title was reactivated in May 1997 and promoted by a handful of NWA-affiliated independent promotions, until it was vacated in October 2017.

In October 2018, the title was renamed the "NWA National Championship", reactivated, and the NWA (now a promotion, instead of a sanctioning body) held an 8-person tournament to crown a new titleholder.

History

The NWA National Heavyweight Championship was the top singles title in the NWA-affiliated promotion, Georgia Championship Wrestling (GCW), from 1980 until 1986. Contrary to its name, the title was defended almost exclusively in just one state, Georgia. When World Wrestling Entertainment (then called, the World Wrestling Federation) purchased GCW (Black Saturday (1984)) in July 1984, then-champion The Spoiler signed with the WWF (which even, briefly, recognized the title). Soon thereafter, Championship Wrestling from Georgia—started by former GCW booker Ole Anderson—launched and gained NWA affiliation. The title was awarded to Ted DiBiase.

In 1985, Jim Crockett Promotions purchased the weekend TBS timeslots for wrestling from the WWF, producing its own version of the "World Championship Wrestling" TV show. JCP had also purchased Championship Wrestling from Georgia (taking over its Saturday morning time slot, as well), and began recognizing CWG's championships. Eventually, Crockett held a unification match between his company's NWA United States Champion Nikita Koloff, and NWA National Champion Wahoo McDaniel, which Koloff won. The National title was deactivated, after that.

In May 1997, the title was reactivated and promoted by various NWA-affiliated, independent promotions across the United States.

In October 2017, Billy Corgan's company Lightning One, Inc., purchased the National Wrestling Alliance's intellectual and physical properties. At that point, all pre-existing NWA affiliation agreements with other promotions were ended; most NWA-branded championships (including the National) would be vacated in the months that immediately followed. The only two championships not vacated were the NWA Worlds Heavyweight Championship, and NWA World Women's Championship. Corgan transformed the NWA from a governing body, to a wrestling promotion—one seeking to proudly revive and preserve the mood, look, and feel of the 1970s/1980s, Georgia/Mid-Atlantic era of wrestling.

In October 2018, the NWA announced the National title would be rebooted on the NWA 70th Anniversary Show, with an eight-man, championship tournament featuring: Jay Bradley; Colt Cabana; Sammy Guevara; Mike Parrow; Scorpio Sky; Sam Shaw; Ricky Starks; and Willie Mack. The championship was officially renamed the "NWA National Championship". A new title belt was commissioned: its design was a faithful restoration of the 1970s, Crockett/Mid-Atlantic Wrestling version of the NWA United States Heavyweight Championship belt, with a few modern tweaks.

Reigns
The NWA currently recognizes 90 individual National Championship reigns.

The inaugural champion was Austin Idol. The longest reigning champion is Phil Shatter, who held the title from January 17, 2009 to February 19, 2011, for a total of 763 days. Ricky Murdock holds the record for longest combined reigns (2) at 817 days. Killer Tim Brooks has the shortest reign. Damien Wayne, Phil "Nitro" Monahan, Greg Anthony, Lou Marconi, Paul Orndorff, Tommy Rich, Larry Zbyszko, and Masked Superstar have the most reigns with 3 apiece.

Names

Combined reigns 

See also
List of National Wrestling Alliance championships
List of current champions in the National Wrestling Alliance
NWA Canadian Heavyweight Championship, counterpart in Canada which also started as a regional championship

References

External links 
 Official NWA website
 Official NWA YouTube channel
 Official NWA Facebook page

Georgia Championship Wrestling championships
Jim Crockett Promotions championships
National Wrestling Alliance championships
Heavyweight wrestling championships
National professional wrestling championships